Kate Williams may refer to: 

Kate Williams (historian), British author, historian and TV presenter
Kate Williams (actress) (born 1941), English actress
Kate Williams (1875–1946), Welsh strongwoman with stage name Vulcana
Kate Williams (pianist), jazz pianist and daughter of guitarist John Williams
Kate Williams (chef), chef and restaurateur in Detroit, Michigan
Kate Williams (judge), judge of the Supreme Court of New South Wales

See also
Kate Williamson (1931–2013), American actress
Katie Williams (disambiguation)
Katherine Williams (disambiguation)